Oddvar Igland (born 22 November 1963) is a Norwegian politician for the Centre Party.

He served as a deputy representative to the Parliament of Norway from Akershus during the term 2017–2021. He resides in Asker.

References

1963 births
Living people
Deputy members of the Storting
Centre Party (Norway) politicians
Asker politicians